Volodymyr Sitkin (6 December 1934 – 17 January 2019) was a Ukrainian athlete. He competed in the men's high jump at the 1956 Summer Olympics, representing the Soviet Union.

References

1934 births
2019 deaths
Athletes (track and field) at the 1956 Summer Olympics
Ukrainian male high jumpers
Olympic athletes of the Soviet Union
Place of birth missing
Soviet male high jumpers